Ugrinovci (Serbian Cyrillic: Угриновци) is a suburban settlement of Belgrade, Serbia. It is located in Belgrade's municipality of Zemun.

Location 
Ugrinovci is located in the eastern section of the Syrmia region, in the western part of the municipality of Zemun, near the administrative border of the municipality of Vojvodina. It is located on the Batajnica-Dobanovci road.

Demographics
The population of Ugrinovci has been steadily growing for the last four decades. The population according to the official censuses:
 1948 - 1,769
 1953 - 1,728
 1961 - 1,895
 1971 - 2,258
 1981 - 3,278
 1991 - 4,007
 2002 - 7,199
 2012 - 10,807

Ethnic structure 

In 2002, 97.33% of residents were Serbs and 0.55% were Romani.

Characteristics 
Ugrinovci is a village with the majority of its population employed in agriculture. Since the detachment of the municipality of Surčin from Zemun in 2003, Ugrinovci has remained the only separate settlement in the municipality of Zemun, as all the other settlements (Batajnica, Zemun Polje, former city of Zemun, etc.) are part of the Belgrade city proper (uža teritorija grada).

The name of the village comes from the medieval name for Hungarians (Ugri).

See also 
 Busije
 Grmovac

References 

 Jovan Đ. Marković (1990): Enciklopedijski geografski leksikon Jugoslavije; Svjetlost-Sarajevo;

External links 

 

Suburbs of Belgrade
Populated places in Syrmia